Durr-e-Shehwar is an Urdu language Pakistani drama serial written by Umera Ahmad and directed by Haissam Hussain. First broadcast in Pakistan by Hum TV, Durr-e-Shehwar  premiered on 10 March 2012 and has been produced by Momina Duraid and Six Sigma Entertainment. Serial featured an ensemble cast of Sanam Baloch, Samina Peerzada, Qavi Khan, Meekal Zulfiqar, Noman Ejaz, and Nadia Jamil in lead roles. It ended its run on 16 June 2012, after airing 15 episodes. It marked the debut of actress Maya Ali.

The show was written and produced by the makers of Man-o-Salwa, Qaid-e-Tanhai, Malaal, Maat and Zindagi Gulzar Hai. The story entails the complexities of married lives be it in today’s urban setting or yesterday’s traditional times, showed how certain issues are common in every relationship. The strong protagonist gives her marital life much patience and resolve possible. Durr-e-Shehwar was one of the most popular programs of the year, it was released. The series received huge acclaim due to Hussain's direction and received praise for the performances of the lead cast and storyline.

Plot
Durr-e-Shehwar's daughter, Shandana, and her husband, Mansoor's nephew, Haider have been married to each other for the last eight years. But recently there has been a breach in their relationship due to which Shandana decides to spend some time at her maternal home in Murree along with her young daughter, Sophia.

Both Durr-e-Shehwar and Mansoor love Shandana and Sophia a lot. But Shandana envies her mother thinking that she led a comfortable and happy life with a loving husband and nothing to worry about. And thus, she often compares Haider with her father. Shandana also undergoes a stage of semi-depression and evens thinks of divorcing Haider. When Mansoor gets to know this, he gets angry with Haider. He reports this matter to his sister i.e. Haider's mother, thus, further complicating the matter. Unable to see Shandana in such a devastated condition, finally one day Durr-e-Shehwar decides to narrate her own life story to Shandana and explain that life for her wasn't as easy as Shandana thinks it to be.

When Durr-e-Shehwar had got married and moved to Mansoor's house, she faced many problems and lost all her comforts and respect that she took for granted in her father’s house. Durr E Shahwar, who’d thought that after her marriage, she’d move with Mansoor to his army allotted house, had to stay with her in-laws, away from him.  Mansoor's mother was cold towards her and did not appreciate her for her good qualities. Mansoor also saw her through the eyes of his mother, and therefore disregarded all her efforts. Durr-e-Shehwar had to struggle for years to gain her mother-in-law's acceptance and also the true love of Mansoor, who had earlier neglected her on the words of his mother. Once or twice she even considered moving to her father’s house but she persisited. Through these hardships, what gave her strength was her father’s letters and advice. The greatest advice he gave her when she told him she didn’t love Mansoor, was to pretend until she did. Soon, Mansoor’s attitude changed and he took her away with her, and her in-laws realised her worth. And when Shahwar saw that the average husband and man, Mansoor was a great father, she forgave him, although she never forgot.

Hearing this story, Shandana realised the difficulty of her mother's life. This decreased Shandana's respect for her father but it calmed her and gave her morale to start a new life with Haider, with the letters of her grandfather, which she inherited from her mother.

Cast

 Sanam Baloch/ Samina Peerzada as Durr-e-Shehwar
 Mikaal Zulfiqar/ Qavi Khan as Mansoor
 Nadia Jamil as Shandana; Durr-e-Shehwar and Mansoor's daughter
 Noman Ejaz as Haider; Shandana's husband
 Sophia Syed as Sophia; Shandana and Haider's daughter
 Umer Naru as Saud; Mansoor's brother
 Syed Mohammad Ahmed as Sami; Durr-e-Shehwar's father
 Saba Faisal as Safia; Mansoor's mother
 Khalid Butt as Mansoor's father
 Kiran Haq as Fazeelat; Mansoor's sister
 Shazde Sheikh as Hafsa; Mansoor's younger sister
 Maya Ali as Mahnoor Sami; Durr-e-Shehwar's sister
 Nasreen Qureshi as matchmaker of Durr-e-Shehwar and Mansoor
 Sumbal Jamil as Farwa; Durr-e-Shehwar's neighbor in Murree
 Osman Khalid Butt as Hassan; Farwa's husband
 Laila Zuberi as Mrs. Habib; Durr-e-Shehwar's friend
 Sonia Nazir as Nazia; Durr-e-Shehwar's friend

Broadcast and release
It aired in India on Zindagi under the title Dhoop Chhaon, premiering on 21 October 2014.

Since mid 2020, it is available for online streaming on ZEE5 under the title Dhoop Chhaon.

Reception 

Durr-e-Shehwar received mostly positive reviews throughout its broadcast; gathered praise for its storyline, direction and performances (especially of the female leads, Peerzada and Baloch). Critics praised the storyline regarding the struggles of women towards the marital relations and criticised the same for the depiction of working women as a "selfish" and constant sufferings of a girl. Hussain's direction was widely praised, with DAWN Images praised it in the words, "Using a clever balance of past, present and near past, director Haissam Hussain kept the momentum going in what might have been just another mazloom aurat (helpless woman) story."

Accolades

References

External links
 

Urdu-language telenovelas
Pakistani telenovelas
2012 telenovelas
2012 Pakistani television series debuts
2012 Pakistani television series endings
Hum TV original programming
Zee Zindagi original programming